Spinovelleda basilewskyi is a species of beetle in the family Cerambycidae. It was described by Stephan von Breuning in 1960.

References

Phrissomini
Beetles described in 1960